Malcolm Leslie Hodder Green  (16 April 1936 – 24 July 2020) was Professor of Inorganic Chemistry at the University of Oxford.  He made many contributions to organometallic chemistry.

Education
Born in Eastleigh, Hampshire, he was educated at Denstone College and received his Bachelor of Science degree from Acton Technical College (London University External Regulations) in 1956 and his PhD from Imperial College of Science and Technology in 1959 for research carried out under the supervision of Geoffrey Wilkinson.

Career

After his PhD, Green undertook a postdoctoral research year with Wilkinson before moving to the University of Cambridge in 1960 as Assistant Lecturer and being appointed a Fellow of Corpus Christi College, Cambridge in 1961. In 1963 he was appointed a Septcentenary Fellow of Inorganic Chemistry at Balliol College, Oxford and a Departmental Demonstrator at the University of Oxford. In 1965 he was made a Lecturer and he was also a Royal Society Senior Research Fellow in Oxford 1979–86. In 1989 he was appointed Professor of Inorganic Chemistry and Head of the Inorganic Chemistry Laboratory at Oxford and Fellow of St Catherine's College, Oxford. In 2004 he became an Emeritus Research Professor. He was a co-founder of the Oxford Catalysts Group plc in 2006.

Green held many visiting positions including: Visiting Professor, Ecole de Chimie and Institute des Substances Naturelles, Paris (1972), Alfred P. Sloan Visiting Professor, Harvard University (1975), Sherman Fairchild Visiting Scholar at the California Institute of Technology (1981), and Walter Hieber Gastprofessor, University of Munich, Germany (1991).

Research 
Green's earliest publications described metal-hydride and metal-olefin complexes, themes that he pursued throughout his career.  Many of his early contributions focused on the chemistry of molybdocene dihydride ((C5H5)2MoH2) and the related tungsten derivative.  These compounds were shown to engage in many reactions related to C-H bond activation.

With Rooney, he was an active proponent of various mechanisms to explain stereochemistry in Ziegler–Natta polymerisation. He used metal vapour synthesis, especially for the preparation of early metal sandwich complexes. He and his students synthesised several examples of complexes exhibiting "agostic" bonds. The word was suggested to him by Jasper Griffin, professor of Classics at Balliol, whom Green asked for an appropriate Greek word to describe the close bonding phenomenon.  This work would later lead to the so-called "modified Green-Rooney mechanism" for Ziegler–Natta catalysis, wherein agostic interactions guide the stereochemistry of the alkene insertion step.  This proposal found wide acceptance.  His work on metal carbide catalysts led to the corporate spin-off company Oxford Catalysts plc, which became Velocys.

Green along with Stephen G. Davies and Michael Mingos compiled a set of rules that summarise where nucleophilic additions will occur on pi ligands known as the Green–Davies–Mingos rules. His former doctoral students include Vernon C. Gibson.

Green developed the covalent bond classification (CBC) method in 1995 to describe the ligands and bonding in coordination and organometallic complexes.

Awards and honours
His numerous awards include: 

1972: Awarded the Corday-Morgan medal in Inorganic Chemistry by the Royal Society of Chemistry (RSC)
1977: Medal in Transition Metal Chemistry from the RSC
1982: Tilden Prize and Lectureship, RSC
1984: American Chemical Society Award in Inorganic Chemistry 
1985: Elected a Fellow of the Royal Society (FRS) 
1985: Medal in Organometallic Chemistry, RSC
1988: Sir Edward Frankland Prize Lecturership, RSC
1995: Awarded the Davy Medal by the Royal Society
1997: Medal in Organometallic Chemistry from the American Chemical Society 
1992: From the Gesellschaft Deutscher Chemiker, the Karl-Ziegler Prize 
2000: Sir Geoffrey Wilkinson Medal and Prize, RSC
 Elected a Fellow of the Royal Society of Chemistry (FRSC)
2015: From the European Association for Chemical and Molecular Sciences, the European Prize for Organometallic Chemistry

See also
Single-walled carbon nanohorn

References

1936 births
2020 deaths
Inorganic chemists
English chemists
Carbon scientists
People educated at Denstone College
Alumni of University of London Worldwide
Alumni of the University of London
Alumni of the University of Cambridge
Alumni of the University of Oxford
Alumni of Imperial College London
Fellows of Balliol College, Oxford
Fellows of the Royal Society
Fellows of the Royal Society of Chemistry
People from Eastleigh
Harvard University staff
Academic staff of the Ludwig Maximilian University of Munich
Members of the University of Cambridge Department of Chemistry
Fellows of Corpus Christi College, Cambridge
Academics of the University of Oxford
Fellows of St Catherine's College, Oxford